Charsznica  is a village in Miechów County, Lesser Poland Voivodeship, in southern Poland. It is the seat of the gmina (administrative district) called Gmina Charsznica.

The village has a population of 1,900.

References

Charsznica